Bill Gates designed and owns a mansion that overlooks Lake Washington in Medina, Washington. The  mansion incorporates technology in its design.

In 2009, property taxes were reported to be US$1.063 million on a total assessed value of US$147.5 million.

Design and features
The house was designed collaboratively by Bohlin Cywinski Jackson and Cutler-Anderson Architects of Bainbridge Island, Washington.

The mansion is a modern design in the Pacific lodge style, with classic features such as a private library with a dome-shaped roof and oculus. The house features an estate-wide server system, a  swimming pool with an underwater music system, a  gym, and a  dining room.

In popular culture 

The house was made fun of in Dilbert in January 1997 when the lead character was forced to become a towel boy after his failure to read an end-user license agreement over purchased Microsoft software.
Some online news articles call the house Xanadu 2.0, a reference to the motion picture Citizen Kane, which was itself a reference to the opening lines of Samuel Taylor Coleridge's classic poem Kubla Khan. The name Xanadu 2.0 is an example of "citogenesis".

References

External links

 Tax info on the house from the King County GIS website

House
Gates family residences
Houses in King County, Washington
Houses in Washington (state)